Texas Justice is a syndicated American arbitration-based reality court show.

In the program, cases were run by former Houston attorney Larry Joe Doherty, and the program was recorded at the studios of Fox station KRIV (Channel 26) in Houston, Texas.

The series lasted for 5 seasons in syndication from March 26, 2001 until November 14, 2005. The show was canceled in September 2005. Living up to the court show's title, the program's look, music and style evoked a country rural presence and cowboy atmosphere. To boot, Doherty had an innate country drawl and a Walker, Texas Ranger-like aura about him.

The show was replaced by Judge Alex, which also taped at KRIV for its first 5 seasons. Judge Alex aired from September 12, 2005 – May 21, 2014.

References

External links
 

2000s American legal television series
2001 American television series debuts
2005 American television series endings
First-run syndicated television programs in the United States
Court shows
Television series by 20th Century Fox Television
Television shows filmed in Texas